Shirley Bassey is a 1961 album by Shirley Bassey, her fifth studio album and her third with EMI/Columbia. Bassey was accompanied by Geoff Love and his orchestra and The Williams Singers (The Rita Williams Singers). The album spent eleven weeks on the charts, beginning in February 1962, and peaking at #14. This album was issued in mono and stereo. The stereo version of this album was released on CD in 1997 by EMI.

Track listing 
Side One.
"Love Is a Many Splendored Thing" (Paul Francis Webster, Sammy Fain) - 2.54
"The Nearness of You" (Ned Washington, Hoagy Carmichael) - 4.20
"Fools Rush In (Where Angels Fear to Tread)" (Rube Bloom, Johnny Mercer) - 2.51
"Who Are We?" (Ned Washington, Jay Livingston) - 4.13
"Angel Eyes" (Matt Dennis, Earl Brent) - 3.20
"Till" (Charles Danvers, Carl Sigman, Pierre Buisson) - 3.58
 
Side Two.
"A Lovely Way to Spend an Evening" (Harold Adamson, Jimmy McHugh) - 3.21
"This Love of Mine" (Frank Sinatra, Sol Parker, Henry W. Sanicola) - 3.06
"You're Nearer" (Richard Rodgers, Lorenz Hart) - 2.39
"Goodbye Lover-Hello Friend" (Norman Newell, Michael Carr) - 3.52
"Where or When" (Richard Rodgers, Lorenz Hart) - 3.24
"Where Are You?" (Harold Adamson, Jimmy McHugh) - 3.16
"Climb Ev'ry Mountain" (Richard Rodgers, Oscar Hammerstein II) - 3.10

Personnel
 Shirley Bassey – Vocal
 The Williams Singers - Vocal choir
 Geoff Love – arranger, conductor
 Geoff Love and his Orchestra - Orchestra

References 

Shirley Bassey albums
1961 albums
EMI Records albums
Columbia Records albums
Albums produced by Norman Newell
Albums arranged by Geoff Love
Albums conducted by Geoff Love